During the 1992–93 English football season, Wimbledon F.C. competed in the inaugural season of the FA Premier League, their seventh successive season of top-division football and the 16th since their election to the Football League.

Season summary
1992–93 began as a struggle for Wimbledon, with the club third from bottom on Boxing Day. However, the team recovered well in the new year and finished the season in a comfortable 12th place, above more highly fancied and wealthier clubs like Everton and Leeds United. Highlights of the season included a 4–0 home win over South London rivals Crystal Palace, a crushing win over Oldham Athletic (5–2 at home), doing the double over Liverpool (2–0 home, 3–2 away) and a shock 1–0 away win over that season's champions, Manchester United. Striker Dean Holdsworth scored 19 league goals for the club to finish the season as one of the Premier League's top goalscorers.

Kit
Wimbledon's kit was manufactured by English company Admiral. The kits carried no sponsorship for the season.

Final league table

Results
Wimbledon's score comes first

Legend

FA Premier League

FA Cup

League Cup

Players

First-team squad

References

Notes

Wimbledon F.C. seasons
Wimbledon F.C.